The Groesbeck House is an Italianate style house located at 1304 West Washington Boulevard in Chicago, Illinois, United States.  The house was built in 1869 by Otis L. Wheelock for Abraham Groesbeck. It was designated a Chicago Landmark on January 12, 1993.

References

Houses completed in 1869
Houses on the National Register of Historic Places in Chicago
Chicago Landmarks
1869 establishments in Illinois